606 West 30th Street is a building under construction in Hudson Yards, Manhattan, New York City designed by architect Ismael Levya. Lalezarian is developing the building in coordination with Douglaston Development, which is constructing a neighboring building at 601 West 29th Street. Lalezarian purchased the development site for $36 million in 2015. 606 will sit on infill that was once the Hudson River. Andrew Nelson, writing for real estate website New York YIMBY, has said of the design that: "...the outdated reference and limited formal experimentation do not inspire fascination".

The building will be adjacent to the High Line park and the Hudson Yards development.

References

Residential buildings in Manhattan
Buildings and structures under construction in the United States
Hudson Yards, Manhattan